Lieutenant-General Eric Jean Kenny  is a senior Royal Canadian Air Force officer who has been serving as Commander of the Royal Canadian Air Force since 2022.

Military career
Kenny joined the Canadian Armed Forces in 1989. After training as a fighter pilot on the McDonnell Douglas CF-18 Hornet, he became commander of 4 Wing Cold Lake in 2014 and, in that capacity, was deployed as commander of the Air Task Force–Iraq in Kuwait between October 2014 and April 2015. He went on to be Deputy Commander at 1 Canadian Air Division in Winnipeg in 2016, Director General of Air Readiness at Headquarters Royal Canadian Air Force in Ottawa in 2018 and commander of 1 Canadian Air Division in July 2020. On 12 August 2022, he became the Commander of the Royal Canadian Air Force.

Notes

References

Year of birth missing (living people)
Living people
Royal Canadian Air Force generals